Marisa de los Santos (born August 12, 1966), is a New York Times Best Seller list author, and poet.

Biography
Marisa de los Santos, was born in 1966. She graduated with a bachelor of Arts degree in English from the University of Virginia before completing an Master of Fine Arts in Sarah Lawrence College and going on to gain a PhD from the University of Houston. She married David Teague with whom she has two children. They have also worked on a number of books together. She lives in Wilmington, Delaware and taught in the University of Delaware. de los Santos has been given a grant for her writing by the Delaware Arts Council as well as winning the Rona Jaffe Foundation Writers' Award.

de los Santos writes both novels and poetry. Her poems have been published by Prairie Schooner, The Antioch Review, Poetry, Western Humanities Review as well as the Chelsea, and Virginia Quarterly Review.

Bibliography

 From the Bones Out: Poems, 2000
 Love Walked In: A Novel, 2006
 Belong to Me, 2008
 Falling together, 2011
 Saving Lucas Biggs, with David Teague, 2014
 Connect the Starts, with David Teague, 2015
 The Precious One, 2015
 I'll Be Your Blue Sky, 2018
 I'd Give Anything, 2020

Sources

1966 births
University of Virginia alumni
Sarah Lawrence College alumni
University of Houston alumni
Living people